Khaled Al Saleh (born 15 January 1988) is a Syrian former professional footballer who played as a midfielder.

Club career
Following a successful trial, Al Saleh joined Mabarrah in the Lebanese Premier League on 14 January 2014.

Honours 
Individual
 Lebanese Premier League top assist provider: 2014–15

References

External links 
  (2014–2016; 2018)
  (2017)

1988 births
Living people
People from Latakia
Syrian footballers
Association football midfielders
Tishreen SC players
Kufrsoum SC players
Taliya SC players
Al-Ittihad Aleppo players
Al-Shorta Damascus players
Al Mabarra Club players
Al Nabi Chit SC players
Gokulam Kerala FC players
Al Shabab Al Arabi Club Beirut players
Syrian Premier League players
Lebanese Premier League players
I-League players
Syrian expatriate footballers
Expatriate footballers in Jordan
Expatriate footballers in Lebanon
Expatriate footballers in India
Syrian expatriate sportspeople in Jordan
Syrian expatriate sportspeople in Lebanon
Syrian expatriate sportspeople in India